Mandora (originally titled La Mandore) is an oil-on-canvas painting by French artist Georges Braque, painted in 1909–10. It is in the Tate Modern, in London, which purchased it in 1966.

It is acknowledged as a masterpiece of analytical cubism It presents a string instrument, the mandora, and its subject is typical of the Cubist painters interest in the depiction of musical instruments. Braque explained his own interest: "In the first place because I was surrounded by them, and secondly because their plasticity, their volumes, related to my particular concept of still life".

References

1909 paintings
1910 paintings
Paintings by Georges Braque
Musical instruments in art
Collection of the Tate galleries